Johnny Hamp's Kentucky Serenaders was a US jazz and dance band, active from the late 1910s through the 1920s.  The group was known simply as The Serenaders until Johnny Hamp became the band leader. Johnny Hamp was born in Lancaster, Pennsylvania and should not be confused with British television producer Johnnie Hamp.  According to some sources, he became the leader by chance when the band was performing at the Hershey Ballroom in Hershey, Pennsylvania. The band leader at the time had an argument with the players and walked out. Hamp, who never played a musical instrument in spite of being a jazz fan and had no experience as a conductor (in addition, he only sang whenever the chorus was performed by a vocal ensemble or the whole band), volunteered to lead them for the rest of the evening and they accepted. After the performance, the band asked him to stay on as leader.  The "Kentucky" in the name appears to be related to the band's use of "My Old Kentucky Home" as a theme song, rather than any connection to the U.S. state of Kentucky.

The group toured in the eastern United States and toured England in 1930.  In 1931, the group was renamed Johnny Hamp and His Orchestra.

The group made most of its recordings in New York City on the Victor label.  Their biggest hit was "Black Bottom" recorded in 1926, which led to a dance fad; see Black Bottom (dance).

Hamp continued to record for Victor until April, 1932.  The next session was in August, 1935 for ARC (Melotone, Perfect, Romeo, Oriole).  In December, 1936, Hamp was back with Victor recording for their Bluebird label for only two sessions (the second in February, 1937), which turned out to be their last session.

Band members at different times included:
 Howard Bartlett on clarinet, soprano saxophone, tenor saxophone, vocals
 William Benedict on trombone
 Lester Brewer on trumpet
 Charles Buckwalter on piano, vocals and as arranger
 Franklyn Baur on vocals
 Joe Cassidy on clarinet, alto saxophone, vocals
 Roy Cropper on vocals
 Charles Dale on clarinet, soprano saxophone, alto saxophone
 Cliff Gamet on alto saxophone, vocals
 Carl Grayson (r.n.: Graub) on violin, vocals
 Elwood Groff on bass brass, vocals
 Irwin Hood on piano
 Lewis James on vocals
 Johnny Marvin on vocals
 Johnny McAfee on saxophone, vocals
 Frank Masterson on banjo, vocals
 Frank Munn on vocals
 Billy Murray on vocals
 Walter Pontius on vocals
 Elliot Shaw on vocals
 Charles Socci on guitar, vocals
 Ray Stillson on clarinet, soprano saxophone, alto saxophone
 John Strouse on drums
 Clayton Tewkesbury on trumpet
 Hal White on violin, vocals
 Jayne Whitney on vocals
 Melvin Watkins playing clarinet and saxophone

Johnny Hamp led other bands in the 1930s and early 1940s ending up as a hotel house band leader in Chicago.

Partial discography
 "Breeze Blow My Baby Back" 1919
 "Angry" 1925
 "Black Bottom" 1926 (see 1926 in music) 
 "If I Had a Talking Picture of You" 1929 (see 1929 in music)
 "Venetian Moon" (released on 78 RPM by Columbia records)

The first reference below has a detailed discography.

References

External links
 RedHotJazz.com
 Internet Movie Database
 PastPerfect.com
 Dismuke's Hit of the Week, September 2003
 Solid! - Johnny Hamp
 Johnny Hamp: Information for Answers.com 

American jazz ensembles